Parchur (also Romanized as Parchūr; also known as Parchehvar) is a village in Langarud Rural District, Salman Shahr District, Abbasabad County, Mazandaran Province, Iran. At the 2006 census, its population was 678, in 182 families.

References 

Populated places in Abbasabad County